Begin the Beguine is a 1982 Spanish film written and directed by José Luis Garci, starring Antonio Ferrandis. The plot follows the story of a Spaniard who returns to his homeland after many years in exile when he wins the Nobel Prize in literature. Its original Spanish title is Volver a Empezar, which means Starting Again.

The film won the 1983 Academy Award for Best Foreign Language Film, and was the first Spanish film to do so.

Plot
It is the year 1981, the famous writer Antonio Albajara (Antonio Ferrandis) arrives at Gijón, his hometown, from Stockholm, where he has just received the Nobel Prize in Literature. For forty years, Albajara has been a professor of medieval literature at the University of California, Berkeley. He has alternated his teaching with the literary production that has given him worldwide fame. In Gijón, Antonio is reunited with Elena, his first and great love, before he was forced to his exile in 1937 Civil War. However, this visit is not definitive because a serious and deadly disease affects the writer.

Cast
 Antonio Ferrandis - Antonio Albajara
 Encarna Paso - Elena
 Agustín González - Gervasio Losada
 José Bódalo - Roxu
 Marta Fernández Muro - Carolina
 Pablo Hoyos - Ernesto

Awards
 Academy Award for Best Foreign Language Film (1983)
 Prize of the Ecumenical Jury at the Montreal Film Festival  (1982)

See also
 List of submissions to the 55th Academy Awards for Best Foreign Language Film
 List of Spanish submissions for the Academy Award for Best Foreign Language Film

References

External links
 

1982 films
1982 drama films
Best Foreign Language Film Academy Award winners
1980s Spanish-language films
Spanish drama films
Films with screenplays by José Luis Garci
Films directed by José Luis Garci
1980s Spanish films